William Barret (fl. 1595) was an English divine.

Life
He matriculated as a pensioner of Trinity College, Cambridge, on 1 February 1579–80. 
He proceeded to his M.A. degree in 1588, and was soon afterwards elected fellow of Caius College.

In a Concio ad Clerum, preached by him for the degree of B.D. at Church of St Mary the Great, Cambridge, on 29 April 1595, he violently attacked the Calvinist tenets, then popular at Cambridge.  While rejecting the doctrine of assurance and of the indefectibility of grace, he also handled with unusual freedom the names of Calvin, Peter Martyr, and other believers in unconditioned reprobation. This public attack was not allowed to pass unnoticed. The vice-chancellor, Dr. Dupont, conferred privately with Barret, who, however, remained contumacious, and was next summoned before the heads of colleges. After several conferences, in which Barret acknowledged the justice of the inferences drawn from his sermon, he was ordered to recant. He accordingly read a prescribed form of withdrawal at St. Mary's, on 10 May 1595, but in an "unreverend manner", significant of his unchanged views. On the 20th, some forty fellows memorialised the vice-chancellor in favour of Barret's punishment. 
Once more he was summoned before the heads of colleges, and threatened with expulsion. 

But taking advantage of a libellous account of his sermon circulated by the authorities of St. John's, he appealed to Archbishop Whitgift, a course also adopted by his accusers. The primate, in reply, censured the hasty proceedings of the heads of colleges, who upon this appealed to Lord Burghley, their chancellor, asking permission to punish Barret. The chancellor at first gave his assent, which he withdrew at the request of Whitgift.

The heads now saw that they had gone too far, and in the month of September wrote to the primate, begging that he would settle the matter by inquiry into Barret's opinions. The accused was therefore summoned to Lambeth Palace, and required to answer certain questions sent down from Cambridge. At a second meeting, he was confronted with a deputation headed by Whitaker, and at last consented to make another recantation. This seems to have been done after many delays. In March 1597, the archbishop warned the authorities that Barret was contemplating flight; but he had set out before the letter reached them.

Whilst on the continent Barret embraced the Roman Catholic faith, and eventually returned to England, where he lived as a layman till his death.

Legacy
The fruit of this controversy is seen in the so-called Lambeth Articles. Barret is by some identified with the publisher, who prefixed a letter to his own edition of Robert Southwell's works, entitled St. Peter's Complainte, Mary Magdal Teares, with other works of the author, R. S., London, 1620 and 1630.

Notes

References
Attribution
; Endnotes:
Prynne's Church of England's New Antithesis to Old Arminianism, 1629, pages 12, 42, 121, 134
Canterburies Doome, 1646, pages 164, 176
God no Deluder, p. 29
Fuller's History of Cambridge, 1665, p. 150
Heylyn's Hist. Quinqu-Articularis, 1660, part iii., xx, 69
Hickman's Hist. Quinq-Artic. Exarticulata, 1674, p. 209
Howell's State Trials, xxii. 712
Strype's Life of Whitgift, 1822, ii. 277
Annals of the Reformation, iv. 320, Cooper's Athenæ Cantab., 1861, ii. 236.

Year of birth missing
Year of death missing
Alumni of Trinity College, Cambridge
Anglican priest converts to Roman Catholicism
16th-century English Anglican priests